The Frances Building and Echo Theater  in southeast Portland in the U.S. state of Oregon is a property listed on the National Register of Historic Places. Built in 1911, it was added to the register in 1994. The Frances Building is a two-story structure that faces Southeast Hawthorne Boulevard, while the Echo Theatre is a one-story structure facing Southeast 37th Avenue. The adjoining buildings, constructed as parts of a single project, are separated by a party wall.

Investor Rudolph Christman, who financed construction of the project, named the Frances Building in honor of his wife. It was the first commercial structure built along Hawthorne Boulevard between Southeast 20th and 39th avenues. Other commercial development soon followed, enhanced by the growth of nearby residential areas and construction of trolley lines to serve them. The original first floor of the Frances Building was home to a barber shop, and a dry goods store, a candy store, and a drug store. The second floor included offices and living quarters. Through many decades, commerce has continued on the first floor; seven apartments occupy the second floor.

Entered originally from Hawthorne via a passage through the Frances Building, the Echo Theater was a movie house. Facing competition from the nearby Bagdad Theater, which opened across the street in 1927, the Echo Theater closed, and its entrance was moved to 37th Avenue side. Storage and plumbing companies used the space until 1984, when it again became a theater. Do Jump!, a company of "actorbats", performs in the Echo Theater and teaches movement styles via the Do Jump Movement Theater School.

See also
 National Register of Historic Places listings in Southeast Portland, Oregon

References

External links
 

Portland Eastside MPS
Theatres completed in 1911
1911 establishments in Oregon
Richmond, Portland, Oregon
Portland Historic Landmarks